Agostino Gallo (14 May 1499 – 6 September 1570) was an Italian agronomist.

Although not a man of letters, Agostino Gallo contributed greatly to the store of written agricultural knowledge of his time. He improved methods of cultivating Italian land by studying classical and modern techniques, as well as introducing new crops, such as Alfalfa and Rice. For these reasons, he is considered the father or restorer of Italian agriculture. His most famous work is Giornate Dell' Agricoltura Et De Piaceri Della Villa Etc, which was published between 1550 and 1569 in several languages.

Bibliography 
 Antonio Saltini, Storia delle scienze agrarie, t.I, Dalle origini al Rinascimento, Edagricole, Bologne, 1984, pp. 258–361

1499 births
1570 deaths
16th-century Italian scientists
16th-century Italian writers
Italian agronomists
Italian Renaissance people
Pomologists